The 5th Cavalry Division (5. Kavallerie-Division) was a unit of the German Army in World War I. The division was formed on the mobilization of the German Army in August 1914. The division was dissolved in February 1918.

Combat chronicle 
It was initially assigned to I Cavalry Corps, which preceded the 3rd Army on the Western Front. In October 1914, it was transferred to the Eastern Front. From 14 July 1915 to 1 September 1915, it was designated as Cavalry Corps Hendebreck. It was dismounted in October 1916 and dissolved on 27 February 1918.

A more detailed combat chronicle can be found at the German-language version of this article.

Order of Battle on mobilisation 
On formation, in August 1914, the component units of the division were:

9th Cavalry Brigade (from V Corps District)
4th (1st Silesian) Dragoons "von Bredow"
10th (Posen) Uhlans "Prince August of Württemberg"
11th Cavalry Brigade (from VI Corps District)
1st (Silesian) Life Cuirassiers "Great Elector"
8th (2nd Silesian) Dragoons "King Frederick III"
12th Cavalry Brigade (from VI Corps District)
4th (1st Silesian) Hussars "von Schill"
6th (2nd Silesian) Hussars "Count Götzen"
Horse Artillery Abteilung of the 5th (1st Lower Silesian) Field Artillery "von Podbielski" Regiment
1st Machine Gun Detachment
Pioneer Detachment
Signals Detachment
Heavy Wireless Station 3
Light Wireless Station 3
Light Wireless Station 4
Cavalry Motorised Vehicle Column 5

See: Table of Organisation and Equipment

Changes in organization 
9th Cavalry Brigade became independent on 26 December 1916
11th Cavalry Brigade joined Guard Cavalry Division on 23 March 1918
12th Cavalry Brigade became independent on 20 February 1918

See also 

German Army (German Empire)
German cavalry in World War I
German Army order of battle (1914)

References

Bibliography 
 
 

Cavalry divisions of Germany in World War I
Military units and formations established in 1914
Military units and formations disestablished in 1918